Grammonus opisthodon, the bighead brotula, is a species of fish known from South Africa.

Description 
This fish has an eel-like body with a rounded head. It is dark brown in colour with small brown spots on the head. The dorsal, anal and caudal fins are translucent and continuous with many fine rays. They have no spiny rays.

Distribution and habitat 
This fish is known from two nearby sites off the coast of the Eastern Cape of South Africa.

Conservation 
Only two specimens have been collected - one prior to 1934 and a second in the early 1980s.This species is currently listed as data deficient by the IUCN as very little is known about it.

References 

Fish described in 1934
Fish of South Africa
Data deficient species